Bludov may refer to several places in the Czech Republic:

Bludov (Kutná Hora District), a municipality and village in the Central Bohemian Region
Bludov (Šumperk District), a municipality and village in the Olomouc Region
Bludov Chateau
Bludov Castle

People with the surname
Dmitry Bludov, Russian politician